Bonnaud is a surname. Notable people with the surname include:

 Frédéric Bonnaud (born 1967), head of the Cinémathèque française and French journalist
 Jacques Philippe Bonnaud or Bonneau (1757–1797), French military officer
 Robert Bonnaud (1929–2013), French historian

See also
 Bonneau, surname
 Bonnot, surname
 Christian Bonaud (1957–2019), French Islamologist

French-language surnames